24th Rifle Division can refer to:

 42nd Guards Motor Rifle Division, formerly the 24th Guards Rifle Division
 24th Mechanized Brigade (Ukraine), formerly the 24th Rifle Division